Zouhair Aouad (born April 7, 1989) is a Bahraini long-distance runner. He competed at the 2016 Summer Olympics in the men's 5000 metres race but did not finish in the heats.

References

1989 births
Living people
Bahraini male long-distance runners
Olympic athletes of Bahrain
Athletes (track and field) at the 2016 Summer Olympics
World Athletics Championships athletes for Bahrain
21st-century Bahraini people